Guillermo del Toro Gómez (born 9 October 1964) is a Mexican filmmaker and author. A recipient of three Academy Awards, three BAFTA Awards, and an Emmy Award, his work has been characterized by a strong connection to fairy tales and horror, with an effort to infuse visual or poetic beauty in the grotesque. He has had a lifelong fascination with monsters, which he considers symbols of great power. He is also known for his use of insectile and religious imagery, the themes of Catholicism and celebrating imperfection, underworld and clockwork motifs, practical special effects, dominant amber lighting, and his frequent collaborations with actors Ron Perlman and Doug Jones. 

Throughout his career, del Toro has shifted between Spanish-language films—such as Cronos (1993), The Devil's Backbone (2001), and Pan's Labyrinth (2006)—and English-language films, including Mimic (1997), Blade II (2002), Hellboy (2004) and its sequel Hellboy II: The Golden Army (2008), Pacific Rim (2013), Crimson Peak (2015), The Shape of Water (2017), Nightmare Alley (2021), and Pinocchio (2022).

As a producer or writer, he worked on the films The Orphanage (2007), Don't Be Afraid of the Dark (2010), The Hobbit film series (2012–2014), Mama (2013), The Book of Life (2014), Pacific Rim: Uprising (2018), Scary Stories to Tell in the Dark (2019), and The Witches (2020). In 2022, he created the Netflix anthology horror series Guillermo del Toro's Cabinet of Curiosities, featuring a collection of classical horror stories.

With Chuck Hogan, he co-authored The Strain trilogy of novels (2009–2011), later adapted into a comic-book series (2011–15) and a live-action television series (2014–17). With DreamWorks Animation and Netflix, he created the animated franchise Tales of Arcadia, which includes the series Trollhunters (2016–18), 3Below (2018–19), and Wizards (2020), and the sequel film Trollhunters: Rise of the Titans (2021). Also with DreamWorks, he executive produced Puss in Boots (2011), Kung Fu Panda 2 (2011), Rise of the Guardians (2012), and Kung Fu Panda 3 (2016).

Del Toro is close friends with fellow Mexican filmmakers Alfonso Cuarón and Alejandro G. Iñárritu, and they are collectively known as "The Three Amigos of Cinema." He was included in Time magazine's list of the 100 most influential people in the world in 2018, and he received a motion picture star on the Hollywood Walk of Fame in 2019.

Early life 

Del Toro was born in Guadalajara, the son of Guadalupe Gómez Camberos and automotive entrepreneur Federico del Toro Torres, both of Spanish descent. Raised in a strict Catholic household, he studied at the Centro de Investigación y Estudios Cinematográficos, at the University of Guadalajara. While there he published his first book, a biography of Alfred Hitchcock, a director he has long praised and admired.

When del Toro was about eight years old, he began experimenting with his father's Super 8 camera, making short films with Planet of the Apes toys and other objects. One short focused on a "serial killer potato" with ambitions of world domination; it murdered del Toro's mother and brothers before stepping outside and being crushed by a car. Del Toro made about 10 short films before his first feature, including one titled Matilde, but only the last two, Doña Lupe and Geometria, have been made available. He wrote four episodes and directed five episodes of the cult series La Hora Marcada, along with other Mexican filmmakers such as Emmanuel Lubezki and Alfonso Cuarón.

His first feature was supposed to be stop-motion, and he and his team built sets and about 100 puppets over a three-year period prior to filming. Vandals burglarized the studio one night and destroyed the puppets and sets, which put an end to his project as del Toro decided to switch to a live-action film, Cronos.

Del Toro studied special effects and make-up with special-effects artist Dick Smith. He spent 10 years as a special-effects make-up designer and formed his own company, Necropia. He also co-founded the Guadalajara International Film Festival. Later in his directing career, he formed his own production company, the Tequila Gang.

In 1997, at the age of 33, Guillermo was given a $30 million budget from Miramax Films (then owned by Disney) to shoot another film, Mimic. He was ultimately unhappy with the way Miramax treated him during production, which led to his friend James Cameron almost coming to blows with Miramax co-founder and owner Harvey Weinstein during the 70th Academy Awards.

Career

2000s 
Del Toro has directed a wide variety of films, from comic book adaptations (Blade II, Hellboy and its sequel Hellboy II: The Golden Army) to historical fantasy and horror films, two of which are set in Spain in the context of the Spanish Civil War under the authoritarian rule of Francisco Franco. These two films, The Devil's Backbone and Pan's Labyrinth, are among his most critically acclaimed works. They share similar settings, protagonists and themes with the 1973 Spanish film The Spirit of the Beehive, widely considered to be the finest Spanish film of the 1970s.

Del Toro views the horror genre as inherently political, explaining, "Much like fairy tales, there are two facets of horror. One is pro-institution, which is the most reprehensible type of fairy tale: Don't wander into the woods, and always obey your parents. The other type of fairy tale is completely anarchic and antiestablishment."

He is close friends with two other prominent and critically praised Mexican filmmakers Alfonso Cuarón and Alejandro González Iñárritu. The three often influence each other's directorial decisions, and have been interviewed together by Charlie Rose. Cuarón was one of the producers of Pan's Labyrinth, while Iñárritu assisted in editing the film. The three filmmakers, referred to as the "Three Amigos" founded the production company Cha Cha Cha Films, whose first release was 2008's Rudo y Cursi.

Del Toro has also contributed to the web series Trailers from Hell.

In April 2008, del Toro was hired by Peter Jackson to direct the live-action film adaptation of J. R. R. Tolkien's The Hobbit. On May 30, 2010, del Toro left the project due to extended delays brought on by MGM's financial troubles. Although he did not direct the films, he is credited as co-writer in An Unexpected Journey, The Desolation of Smaug and The Battle of the Five Armies.

On 1 December 2008, del Toro expressed interest in a stop-motion remake of Roald Dahl's novel The Witches in collaboration with Alfonso Cuarón. On 19 June 2018, it was announced that Del Toro and Cuarón would instead be attached as executive producers on the remake with Robert Zemeckis helming the project and writing.

On 2 June 2009, del Toro's first novel, The Strain, was released. It is the first part of an apocalyptic vampire trilogy co-authored by del Toro and Chuck Hogan. The second volume, The Fall, was released on 21 September 2010. The final installment, The Night Eternal, followed in October 2011. Del Toro cites writings of Antoine Augustin Calmet, Montague Summers and Bernhardt J. Hurwood among his favourites in the non-literary form about vampires.

2010s 
On 9 December 2010, del Toro launched Mirada Studios with his long-time cinematographer Guillermo Navarro, director Mathew Cullen and executive producer Javier Jimenez. Mirada was formed in Los Angeles, California to be a collaborative space where they and other filmmakers can work with Mirada's artists to create and produce projects that span digital production and content for film, television, advertising, interactive and other media. Mirada launched as a sister company to production company Motion Theory.

Del Toro directed Pacific Rim, a science fiction film based on a screenplay by del Toro and Travis Beacham. In the film, giant monsters rise from the Pacific Ocean and attack major cities, leading humans to retaliate with gigantic mecha suits called Jaegers. Del Toro commented, "This is my most un-modest film, this has everything. The scale is enormous and I'm just a big kid having fun." The film was released on 12 July 2013 and grossed $411 million at the box office.

Del Toro directed "Night Zero", the pilot episode of The Strain, a vampire horror television series based on the novel trilogy of the same name by del Toro and Chuck Hogan. FX has commissioned the pilot episode, which del Toro scripted with Hogan and was filmed in Toronto in September 2013. FX ordered a thirteen-episode first season for the series on 19 November 2013, and series premiered on 13 July 2014.

After The Strains pilot episode, del Toro directed Crimson Peak, a gothic horror film he co-wrote with Matthew Robbins and Lucinda Cox. Del Toro has described the film as "a very set-oriented, classical but at the same time modern take on the ghost story", citing The Omen, The Exorcist and The Shining as influences. Del Toro also stated, "I think people are getting used to horror subjects done as found footage or B-value budgets. I wanted this to feel like a throwback." Jessica Chastain, Tom Hiddleston, Mia Wasikowska, and Charlie Hunnam starred in the film. Production began February 2014 in Toronto, with an April 2015 release date initially planned. The studio later pushed the date back to October 2015, to coincide with the Halloween season.

He was selected to be on the jury for the main competition section of the 2015 Cannes Film Festival.

Del Toro directed the Cold War drama film The Shape of Water, starring Sally Hawkins, Octavia Spencer, and Michael Shannon. Filming began on 15 August 2016 in Toronto, and wrapped twelve weeks later. On 31 August 2017, the film premiered in the main competition section of the 74th Venice International Film Festival, where it was awarded the Golden Lion for best film, making Del Toro the first Mexican director to win the award. The film became a critical and commercial success and would go on to win multiple accolades, including the Academy Award for Best Picture, with del Toro winning the Academy Award for Best Director.

Del Toro collaborated with Japanese video game designer Hideo Kojima to produce P.T., a video game intended to be a "playable trailer" for the ninth Silent Hill game, which was cancelled. The demo was also removed from the PlayStation Network.

At the D23 Expo in 2009, his Double Dare You production company and Disney announced a production deal for a line of darker animated films. The label was announced with one original animated project, Trollhunters: Tales of Arcadia. However, del Toro moved his deal to DreamWorks Animation in late 2010. From 2016 to 2018, Trollhunters was released to great acclaim on Netflix and "is tracking to be its most-watched kids original ever."

In 2017, Del Toro had an exhibition of work at the Minneapolis Institute of Art titled Guillermo del Toro: At Home with Monsters, featuring his collection of paintings, drawings, maquettes, artifacts, and concept film art. The exhibition ran from 5 March 2017, to 28 May 2017.

In 2019, del Toro appeared in Hideo Kojima's video game Death Stranding, providing his likeness for the character Deadman.

2020s 
In December 2017, Searchlight Pictures announced that del Toro would direct a new adaptation of the 1946 novel Nightmare Alley by William Lindsay Gresham, the screenplay of which he co-wrote with Kim Morgan. In 2019, it was reported that Bradley Cooper, Cate Blanchett, Toni Collette and Rooney Mara had closed deals to star in the film, which went into production in January 2020. It was released in December 2021 to positive reviews. The film received four Academy Award nominations, including Best Picture.

In 2008, del Toro announced he was working on a dark stop-motion film adaptation of the Italian novel The Adventures of Pinocchio, co-directed by Adam Parrish King, with The Jim Henson Company as production company, and music by Nick Cave. The project had been in development for over a decade. The pre-production was begun by the studio ShadowMachine. In 2017, del Toro announced that Patrick McHale is co-writing the script of the film. In the same year, del Toro revealed at the 74th Venice International Film Festival that the film will be reimagined during the rise of Benito Mussolini, and that he would need $35 million to make it. In November 2017, it was reported that del Toro had cancelled the project because no studios were willing to finance it. In October 2018, it was announced that the film had been revived, with Netflix backing the project. Netflix had previously collaborated with del Toro on Trollhunters. Many of the same details of the project remain the same, but with Mark Gustafson now co-directing rather than Adam Parrish King. It premiered at the BFI London Film Festival on 15 October 2022, and received a theatrical release on 9 November of the same year before a scheduled release on Netflix in December. The film won the Best Animated Feature at the 95th Academy Awards.

Del Toro revealed plans to direct a stop-motion adaptation of the Kazuo Ishiguro novel The Buried Giant in January 2023, which he is co-writing with Dennis Kelly, as well as an as-yet unrevealed live-action film that he will shoot first. In February, it was announced that del Toro would reteam with Netflix and ShadowMachine on The Buried Giant. In March 15, 2023, it was confirmed that Oscar Isaac, Andrew Garfield and Mia Goth were in talks to star in his long in-development Frankenstein film, now based at Netflix.

Personal life 
Del Toro was married to Lorenza Newton, cousin of Mexican singer Guadalupe Pineda. They have two daughters. They started dating when both were studying at the Instituto de Ciencias in Guadalajara. Del Toro and Newton separated in early 2017, and divorced in September of the same year. He maintains residences in Toronto and Los Angeles, and returns to Guadalajara every six weeks to visit his family. In 2021, he married film historian Kim Morgan. 

Del Toro also owns two houses devoted exclusively to his collection of books, poster artwork, and other belongings pertaining to his work. He explains, "As a kid, I dreamed of having a house with secret passages and a room where it rained 24 hours a day. The point of being over 40 is to fulfill the desires you've been harboring since you were 7."

In 2009, del Toro signed a petition that called for the release of film director Roman Polanski, who was arrested in Switzerland in relation to his 1977 charge for drugging and raping a 13-year-old girl.

Del Toro also has an honorary doctorate from the National Autonomous University of Mexico (UNAM), one of the top Spanish-speaking universities in the world. In November 2022, UNAM awarded him the Honoris Causa Doctorate for his "contributions to culture and his support for youth."

Politics 
In a 2007 interview, del Toro described his political position as "a little too liberal". He pointed out that the villains in most of his films, such as the industrialist in Cronos, the Nazis in Hellboy, Italian Fascism in Pinocchio, and the Francoists in Pan's Labyrinth, are united by the common attribute of authoritarianism. "I hate structure. I'm completely anti-structural in terms of believing in institutions. I hate them. I hate any institutionalized social, religious, or economic thing."

Religion 
Del Toro was raised Catholic. In a 2009 interview with Charlie Rose, he described his upbringing as excessively "morbid", saying, "I mercifully lapsed as a Catholic... but as Buñuel used to say, 'I'm an atheist, thank God.'" He insists that he is spiritually "not with Buñuel" and that he is "once a Catholic, always a Catholic, in a way." He concluded, "I believe in Man. I believe in mankind, as the worst and the best that has happened to this world." He has also responded to the observation that he views his art as his religion by saying, "It is. To me, art and storytelling serve primal, spiritual functions in my daily life. Whether I'm telling a bedtime story to my kids or trying to mount a movie or write a short story or a novel, I take it very seriously." Nevertheless, he became a "raging atheist" after seeing a pile of human fetuses while volunteering at a Mexican hospital. He has claimed to be horrified by the way the Catholic Church complied with Francoist Spain, down to having a character in his film quote what actual priests would say to Republican faction members in concentration camps. Upon discovering the religious beliefs of C.S. Lewis, del Toro has stated that he can no longer relate to Lewis and his work, despite having done so beforehand. He describes Lewis as "too Catholic" for him, despite the fact that Lewis was never a Catholic.

However, del Toro is not entirely disparaging of Catholic Christianity, and his background continues to influence his work. While discussing The Shape of Water, del Toro discussed the Catholic influence on the film, stating, "A very Catholic notion is the humble force, or the force of humility, that gets revealed as a god-like figure toward the end. It's also used in fairy tales. In fairy tales, in fact, there is an entire strand of tales that would be encompassed by the title 'The Magical Fish.' And [it's] not exactly a secret that a fish is a Christian symbol." In the same interview, he still maintained that he does not believe in an afterlife, stating "I don't think there is life beyond death, I don't. But I do believe that we get this clarity in the last minute of our life. The titles we achieved, the honors we managed, they all vanish. You are left alone with you and your deeds and the things you didn't do. And that moment of clarity gives you either peace or the most tremendous fear, because you finally have no cover, and you finally realize exactly who you are."

Interests 
In 2010, del Toro revealed that he was a fan of video games, describing them as "the comic books of our time" and "a medium that gains no respect among the intelligentsia." He has stated that he considers Ico and Shadow of the Colossus to be masterpieces.

He cites Gadget Invention, Travel, & Adventure, Cosmology of Kyoto, Asteroids and Galaga as his favorite games.

Del Toro's favorite film monsters are Frankenstein's monster, the Alien, Gill-man, Godzilla, and the Thing. Frankenstein in particular has a special meaning for him, in both film and literature, as he claims he has a "Frankenstein fetish to a degree that is unhealthy," and that it's "the most important book of my life, so you know if I get to it, whenever I get to it, it will be the right way." He lists Brazil, Nosferatu, Freaks and Bram Stoker's Dracula among his favourite films. He also cited Japanese anime Doraemon as "the greatest kids series ever created".

Del Toro is also highly interested in Victorian culture. He said, "I have a room of my library at home called 'The Dickens room'. It has every work by Charles Dickens, Wilkie Collins and many other Victorian novelists, plus hundreds of works about Victorian London and its customs, etiquette, architecture. I'm a Jack the Ripper aficionado, too. My museum-slash-home has a huge amount of Ripperology in it."

Father's 1997 kidnapping 
Around 1997, del Toro's father, Federico del Toro Torres, was kidnapped in Guadalajara. Del Toro's family had to pay twice the amount originally asked for as a ransom. Immediately after learning of the kidnapping, fellow filmmaker James Cameron, a friend of del Toro since they met after the production of 1993's Cronos, offered to help Del Toro pay for the negotiator, which he accepted. After the ransom was paid, Federico was released, having spent 72 days kidnapped. The culprits were never apprehended, and the money of both Cameron and del Toro's families was never recovered. The event prompted del Toro, his parents, and his siblings to move abroad. In a 2008 interview with Time magazine, he said this about the kidnapping of his father: "Every day, every week, something happens that reminds me that I am in involuntary exile [from my country]."

Favorite films 
In 2012, del Toro participated in the Sight & Sound film polls of that year. Held every ten years to select the greatest films of all time, contemporary directors were asked to select ten films of their choice.

 8½ (Italy, 1963)
 Beauty and the Beast (France, 1946) 
 Frankenstein (USA, 1931)
 Freaks (USA, 1932)
 Goodfellas (USA, 1990)
 Greed (USA, 1924)
 Los Olvidados (Mexico, 1950)
 Modern Times (USA, 1936)
 Nosferatu (Germany, 1922)
 Shadow of a Doubt (USA, 1943)

In 2022, del Toro participated in the poll for the second time. His selections were:

 Barry Lyndon (USA/UK, 1975)
 Goodfellas (USA, 1990)
 City Lights (USA, 1931) 
 Close Encounters of the Third Kind (USA, 1977)
 Bride of Frankenstein (USA, 1935)
 8½ (Italy, 1963)
 Nazarin (Mexico, 1959)
 No Country For Old Men (USA, 2007)
 Shadow of a Doubt (USA, 1943)
 The Magnificent Ambersons (USA, 1942)

Filmography

Film

Television

Recurring collaborators

Bibliography
 Alfred Hitchcock (1990)
 The Strain (2009)
 The Fall (2010)
 The Night Eternal (2011)
 Cabinet of Curiosities (2013)
 Trollhunters (2015)
 The Shape of Water (2018)
 Pan's Labyrinth: The Labyrinth of the Faun (2019)
 The Hollow Ones (2020)

Awards and nominations

Del Toro is the first filmmaker to win Academy Awards for Best Director, Best Picture and Best Animated Feature for different films, for his work of The Shape of Water and Pinocchio, respectively.

See also 
 Cinema of Mexico
 Guillermo del Toro's unrealized projects

Notes

References

External links 

 
 
 Del Toro Webcast on BAFTA.org
 Premiere Magazine: Inside Del Toro's Sketchbook

1964 births
Animation screenwriters
Annie Award winners
Ariel Award winners
Best Directing Academy Award winners
Best Director Ariel Award winners
Best Director BAFTA Award winners
Best Director Golden Globe winners
Directors of Golden Lion winners
Filmmakers who won the Best Foreign Language Film BAFTA Award
Artists from Guadalajara, Jalisco
Daytime Emmy Award winners
DreamWorks Animation people
English-language film directors
Fantasy film directors
Film directors from Toronto
Film festival founders
Former Roman Catholics
Horror film directors
Hugo Award-winning writers
Living people
Male actors from Guadalajara, Jalisco
Male actors from Toronto
Male novelists
Male television writers
Mexican atheists
Mexican emigrants to Canada
Mexican emigrants to the United States
Mexican film directors
Mexican film producers
Mexican filmmakers
Mexican male screenwriters
Mexican male film actors
Mexican male television actors
Mexican male novelists
Mexican people of Spanish descent
Mexican television directors
Mexican television producers
Mexican television writers
Nebula Award winners
Netflix people
Producers who won the Best Picture Academy Award
Spanish-language film directors
University of Guadalajara alumni
Writers from Guadalajara, Jalisco
Writers from Toronto
Directors of Best Animated Feature Academy Award winners
Producers who won the Best Animated Feature Academy Award